Waterfront is the debut studio album by British sophistipop duo Waterfront.  Released in both the UK and the US in 1989, it featured the hit single "Cry", which reached number 10 in the U.S. in 1989.

Track listing
All songs written and arranged by Waterfront (SBK Music Ltd.)
"Tightrope" - 3:34
"Cry" - 3:54
"Platinum Halo" - 3:40
"Nature of Love" - 4:54
"Move On" - 4:25
"Dancing with Strangers" - 4:28
"Set You Free" - 3:37
"Broken Arrow" - 4:31
"Soul Survivor" - 3:48
"Waterfront" - 5:17
"Saved" - 3:20

Personnel

Waterfront
Chris Duffy - vocals
Phil Cilia - guitar

Additional personnel
Martin Shellard - guitar solos on tracks 1, 3 and 9; additional guitars on tracks 2, 4-8 and 10 
Pete Glenister - additional guitars on tracks 3, 9 and 10
Richard Dunn, Peter Marshall - keyboards
Chris Senior - additional keyboards
John Newman - additional keyboard programming
Chris Childs - bass
Greg Haver - drums, drum programming
Jeff Scantlebury - percussion
Molly Duncan, Gary Barnacle - saxophone
Neil Sidwell - trombone
Dee and Shirley Lewis - backing vocals
Anne Dudley - strings arrangements, conductor

Production
Arranged by Waterfront
Produced by Glenn Skinner; track 11 produced by Waterfront
Recording and mix engineers: David Shell and Neil Brockbank
Assistant Engineers: Alistair Johnson, Eugene Ellis, Ian Clarke, Phil Thornalley, Spencer Henderson

References

1989 debut albums
Waterfront (band) albums
Sophisti-pop albums
Polydor Records albums